The Cutting Room Floor is the debut mixtape by The Alchemist released in 2003 by ALC Records.

Track listing 

All tracks produced by The Alchemist, except track 4 and track 8, which were produced by Havoc.

 "Intro"
 "Street Team (Remix)" [feat. M.O.P. & Kool G Rap] 
 "Friday Night Flavas"
 "Walk With Me" [performed by Havoc]
 "Deep Meditation" (feat. Lil' Dap)
 "Mobb Show Intro"
 "Still in Effect" (feat. Freeway)
 "First to Drop a Beat the Boldest" [performed by Havoc & G.O.D. Pt. 3]
 "In Jail" (feat. Nashawn)
 "P Broke the Switch" (feat. Prodigy)
 "Thug Shit, Queens Cliques" (feat. Kool G Rap & Capone-N-Noreaga)
 "Friday Night Flavas Pt. 2"
 "Thieves" (feat. Dilated Peoples & Prodigy)
 "That's My Style" (feat. Big Noyd)
 "Stay Bent" (feat. Inspectah Deck)
 "Backwards" (feat. Mobb Deep)
 "Kay Slay Shit" (feat. Infamous Mobb & Chinky)

References 

Debut mixtape albums
Albums produced by the Alchemist (musician)
The Alchemist (musician) albums
2003 mixtape albums